Martina Hingis was the defending champion, but did not participate this year due to a hip injury.

Jelena Janković defeated Svetlana Kuznetsova 7–5, 6–1 to win her second Tier I title.

Seeds
The top eight seeds received a bye into the second round.

Draw

Finals

Top half

Section 1

Section 2

Bottom half

Section 3

Section 4

References
 

Women's Singles
Italian Open - Singles